The 2022 Super2 & Super3 Series was an Australian motor racing competition for Supercars as a support series. It was the twenty-third running of the Supercars Development Series, the second tier of competition in Supercars racing. Since joining as a class in 2021 this also marked at the same time as the fifteenth running of the Super3 Series, the third tier of competition in Supercars racing (Officially in 2019 as the Kumho Tyre Super3 Series).

Entries

Classes

Entry list

Team Changes

Super2
Matt Stone Racing fielded two Super2 cars, expanding from running a single car in 2021.

Grove Junior Team joined the championship fielding a single Nissan Altima L33 for Matthew Payne.

Brad Jones Racing returns to the championship after a year's absence fielding a Holden Commodore VF for Elly Morrow.

Paul Morris Motorsport returned to the championship after last competing in 2018 fielding a single Ford FG X Falcon for current Super3 Series Champion Nash Morris.

Eggleston Motorsport scaled down its commitment to the series from three cars to two.

MW Motorsport scaled down its commitment to the series from four cars to three.

Super3 
Eggleston Motorsport scaled there operation up to three cars, running two Holden VE Commodores for Steven Page and Kai Allen and a Ford FG Falcon for David Murphy.

Driver Changes

Super2
Triple Eight Race Engineering fielded a new driver lineup with Cameron Hill who graduated from Porsche Carrera Cup Australia to replace Broc Feeney graduated to the Supercars Championship to replace Jamie Whincup. Declan Fraser left MW Motorsport to replace Angelo Mouzouris who took over his spot at MW Motorsport.

Matthew Payne, who graduated from Porsche Carrera Cup Australia, joined Grove Racing on a full time basis.

Brad Jones Racing driver Elly Morrow graduated from Super3 Series.

Cameron Crick graduated from SuperUtes Series to join Eggleston Motorsport.

Ryal Harris graduated from SuperUtes Series to join Matt Stone Racing.

Jay Hanson graduated from TCR Australia to join Image Racing.

Thomas Maxwell joined MW Motorsport.

Nash Morris graduated from Super3 Series to join Paul Morris Motorsport.

Super3
Brad Vaughan graduated from Toyota 86 Racing Series to join Anderson Motorsport.

Bradley Neill returned to Super3 to join Matt Stone Racing.

Kai Allen graduated from Toyota 86 Racing Series to join Eggleston Motorsport.

Calendar 
Six rounds hosted a round of the 2022 championship:

Results and standings

Season summary

Super2 Series

Super3 Series

Series standings

Points system
Points were awarded for each race at an event, to the driver of a car that completed at least 75% of the race distance and was running at the completion of the race. At least 50% of the planned race distance must be completed for the result to be valid and championship points awarded. The following points scales apply to both the Super2 and Super3 Series.

Super2 Series

Super3 Series

Notes

References

Supercars Development Series
Super 2